INS Viraat (Sanskrit: Virāṭa meaning Giant) was a  of the Indian Navy. INS Viraat was the flagship of the Indian Navy until  was commissioned in 2013. The ship was completed and commissioned in 1959 as the Royal Navy's , and decommissioned in 1984. It was sold to India in 1987. INS Viraat was commissioned into the Indian Navy on 12 May 1987, and served for almost 30 years.

In February 2015, the Navy stated that Viraat would be decommissioned the following year. The last British-built ship serving with the Indian Navy, she was the oldest aircraft carrier in service in the world. On 23 July 2016, Viraat sailed for the last time under her own power from Mumbai to Kochi, where she was dry-docked and prepared for decommissioning. She was towed out of Kochi on 23 October, returning to Mumbai on 28 October, where she was laid up. Viraat was formally decommissioned on 6 March 2017. After the failure of plans to convert her into a hotel and museum, she was sold for scrap and planned to be broken up beginning in September 2020, but the scrapping was stayed by the Supreme Court of India after 40% of the body had already been scrapped.

Design
The magazine capacity included at least 80 lightweight torpedoes. The vessel retained commando transport capability for up to 750 troops and carried four LCVP landing craft in the aft section. In a wartime scenario, the ship could carry up to 26 combat aircraft and was suited for supporting amphibious operations and conducting ASW operations.

Aircraft
The aircraft on board INS Viraat were operated by four squadrons of the Naval air arm of the Indian Navy:

Primary strike aircraft have been the Sea Harriers operating several modern missiles such as the British anti-ship Sea Eagle missile,  and the French Matra Magic missile for air-to-air combat. Other ordnance has included 68 mm rockets, runway-denial bombs, cluster bombs, and podded 30 mm cannon. In 2006, the Indian Navy started the 'Limited Upgrade Sea Harrier (LUSH)' program by upgrading up to 15 Sea Harriers in collaboration with Israel by installing the Elta EL/M-2032 radar and the Rafael 'Derby' medium-range air-to-air BVR missile.

The fleet also consisted of Kamov Ka-31 Helix-B airborne early warning aircraft and Kamov Ka-28 Helix-A helicopters.

All Sea Harrier operations from the deck of INS Viraat ceased on 6 May 2016 following the retirement of Harrier fleet.

Operational history

Royal Navy

She served as the flagship of the Royal Navy's task force during the Falklands War in 1982 and was decommissioned from active duty in 1985. In April 1986, Hermes was towed from Portsmouth Dockyard to Devonport Dockyard to be refitted, re-activated and sold to India.

Indian Navy
After evaluating vessels from several countries, the Indian Navy purchased the vessel in April 1986 and gave her an extensive refit at Devonport Dockyard in Plymouth, England, to allow for continued carrier operations into the next decade. New fire control equipment, navigation radars, improved NBC protection, and deck landing aids were installed in this refit. Boilers were converted to operate on distillate fuel.

India Today in 1988 reported that then Prime Minister Rajiv Gandhi went to the Bangaram Atoll in Lakshadweep on a holiday with his family and other prominent politicians and media persons on board the INS Viraat. The allegation has been refuted by a retired Indian Navy officer, Commodore Ajay Chitnis, who was involved in planning former Prime Minister Rajiv Gandhi's 1987 Lakshadweep trip.

In September 1993, the engine room of the ship was flooded, putting the vessel out of service for several months. The vessel was back in service in 1995 and was fitted with a new search radar. Between July 1999 and April 2001, the ship completed another life-extension refit expected to extend her serviceability until 2010. This refit upgraded propulsion systems, added a package of sensors to sound emergency alerts and introduced modern communication systems. In addition, a long-range surveillance radar, weapon systems, and a new hangar with fire curtains were installed.

The ship underwent a fourth refit in Indian service from January to August 2009 at Cochin Shipyard, Kochi. The refit was expected to ensure her continued service in the Indian Navy until 2015, and the ship went through exercises in the Arabian Sea for a month and a half before being deployed to the Gulf of Aden. Navy officers later reported that the carrier might be kept in service until 2020, as two Indigenous Aircraft Carriers (IACs) seemed likely to be fully operational by then. On 12 July 2011, the ship arrived at Cochin shipyard for a short refit scheduled to be completed in two months and it was repainted. Indian Navy indicated that the ship could remain in service until 2020, provided that there are still Sea Harriers available for ship-borne operations.

On 2 November 2012, the ship arrived in Kochi for the first part of a major two-phase refit. In the first phase, the hull was cleaned, probed for corrosion, worn hull plates were reinforced and received a fresh coat of corrosion-resistant paint. The carrier sailed to Mumbai for further upgrades to her machinery before rejoining the fleet in the summer of 2013. The refit would enable her to serve through 2016 and was the final major refit before her decommissioning. In August–September 2015, the ship underwent a short refit to reinforce her hull and inspection before her participation in the International Fleet Review in February 2016.

Decommissioning
By 2013, Viraats age and cost of maintenance prompted the navy to begin the process to obtain Defence Ministry clearance for her decommissioning; in December 2014, a review board was established to determine the ship's continued service life.

In February 2015, the navy announced plans to decommission the ship in 2016 and began the process to obtain Defence Ministry clearance for the carrier's decommissioning. On 23 July 2016, Viraat sailed from Mumbai to Kochi for the last time under her own steam; by then, she had spent a total of 2,250 days at sea and had steamed a total of 1,094,215 kilometers. At Kochi, she underwent a month-long deactivation in preparation for decommissioning; during this period, her boilers, engines, propellers and rudders were removed. Deactivation was completed on 4 September, and the carrier was towed back to Mumbai on 23 October for her formal decommissioning ceremony. Viraat arrived in Mumbai on 28 October and was laid up. On 6 March 2017, she was decommissioned. Viraat was formally decommissioned on 6 March 2017. Her weapons systems and operational equipment were to have been removed by mid-2017.

Preservation plans
By April 2016, however, the plans had apparently fallen through. A British businessman's proposal to preserve the ship failed when its crowdfunding campaign failed to make a tenth of its goal and it was stated that if Viraat was not to be preserved, she would be scrapped.

On 1 November 2018 the Maharashtra cabinet approved the conversion of Viraat into India's first moored maritime museum and marine adventure centre, to be located near Nivati, Sindhudurg district. This proposal, which included a hotel, did not attract tenders because of high cost, and the state government abandoned it in November 2019.

She was scheduled be dismantled at Alang starting in September 2020. On 19 September 2020, Viraat was towed from her berth at the Mumbai Naval Dockyard to the scrappers at Alang in the Bhavnagar district of Gujarat, reaching the port at Alang on the evening of 22 September.

On 28 September, Viraat was beached at Alang. At the end of September, a private Mumbai-registered company, Envitech Marine Consultants Private Limited, offered to purchase the ship from Shree Ram Shipping and preserve her as a museum and tourist centre, to be provisionally berthed at Goa. The Goa state government gave its support provided the project was approved by the Ministry of Defence, the necessary clearances were obtained and the state would incur no financial obligations. Discussions were in progress as of 1 October.

On 10 February 2021 a Supreme Court hearing stayed the dismantling of the ship. The Court heard that Envitech proposed to purchase the ship for RS 100 cr and sought responses from Shree Ram Shipping and the Ministry of Defence. On 10 April 2021, the Supreme Court informed counsel for Envitech that INS Viraat had already become private property of Shree Ram Group; who had testified that 40% of the ship had already been broken.

There is a plan to have two of INS Viraat's anchors displayed at the Port Museum in Alappuzha, which is being developed.

Gallery

Commanding officers

See also
List of aircraft carriers

References

External links

Indian Navy
INS Viraat - Bharat Rakshak
Huge disappointment to Andhra Pradesh - Deccan Chronicle

Centaur-class aircraft carriers of the Indian Navy
Ships built in Barrow-in-Furness
1953 ships
Aircraft carriers of India